Rincón de Sabanilla is a district of the San Pablo canton, in the Heredia province of Costa Rica.

History 
Rincón de Sabanilla was created on 19 November 2008 by Decreto Ejecutivo 34914-MG, segregated from San Pablo.

Geography 
Rincón de Sabanilla has an area of  km2 and an elevation of  metres.

Demographics 

For the 2011 census, Rincón de Sabanilla had a population of  inhabitants.

Transportation

Road transportation 
The district is covered by the following road routes:
 National Route 5

Rail transportation 
The Interurbano Line operated by Incofer goes through this district.

References 

Districts of Heredia Province
Populated places in Heredia Province